Kim Zetter is an American investigative journalist and author who has covered cybersecurity and national security since 1999. She has broken numerous stories over the years about NSA surveillance, WikiLeaks, and the hacker underground, including an award-winning series about the security problems with electronic voting machines. She has three times been voted one of the top ten security journalists in the U.S. by her journalism peers and security professionals. She is considered one of the world's experts on Stuxnet, a malicious computer worm used to sabotage Iran's nuclear program, and published a book on the topic called Countdown to Zero Day: Stuxnet and the Launch of the World's First Digital Weapon.

Biography
She has written on a wide variety of subjects from the Kabbalah to dining out in San Francisco to Israel to cryptography and electronic voting, and her work has been published in newspapers and magazines all over the world, including the Los Angeles Times, San Francisco Chronicle, Jerusalem Post, San Jose Mercury News, Detroit Free Press, and the Sydney Morning Herald. She has been a staff reporter at Wired, a writer and editor at PC World, and a guest on NPR and CNN.

Zetter has interviewed and written about many notable people including sculptor Jim Sanborn (creator of the CIA's Kryptos sculpture), Ed Scheidt (Chairman of the CIA's Cryptographic Center), Mike Lynn (about the Cisco scandal in 2005), Australian film director Baz Luhrmann, 
United States Assistant Attorney General Viet Dinh (creator of the Patriot Act), 
 and the famous cryptographer Bruce Schneier.

Though born in the United States, she got her start as a journalist in Israel, when she was living there for three years.  Some of her first articles were written for the Jerusalem Post.  She speaks English and Hebrew, and her book on the Kabbalah has been published in multiple languages.

Selected articles 
 Three Minutes with Jeff Moss, April 3, 2001, PC World (interview with the founder of the Def Con and Black Hat security conferences)
 Baz brings bohemians to the Bay, October 18, 2002, The Age: Melbourne, Australia (on Baz Luhrmann)
 BlackBerry Reveals Bank's Secrets, August 25, 2003, Wired News
 Time to Recall E-Vote Machines?, October 6, 2003, Wired News
 Did E-Vote Firm Patch Election?, October 13, 2003,  Wired News
 How E-voting Threatens Democracy, April 2, 2004, Wired News
 Solving the Enigma of Kryptos, January 26, 2005, Wired News
 Why Racial Profiling Doesn't Work, August 22, 2005, Salon.com
 The Secret Seven, Jun 13, 2008, Condé Nast Portfolio
 PIN Crackers Nab Holy Grail of Bank Card Security , April 14, 2009, Wired News

Awards 
 2005, Maggie Award (Western Publications Association), Best Web Article/Consumer, for "How E-Voting Threatens Democracy" 
 2004, IRE Awards (Investigative Reporters and Editors), Finalist, Online category, for "Machine Politics" (E-voting series)
 2002, Maggie Award (Western Publications Association), Best Online Interview/Profile, for "Three Minutes with Hacker Fosdick" 
 2000, Neal Award (American Business Media), Best Single Issue, for "Privacy 2000" (PC Magazine - edited cover story)
 2000, ASBPE (American Society of Business Publication Editors), National Silver Award, Best Original Web Feature, for "What Makes Johnny - and Jane - Write Viruses?"
 2000, ASBPE (American Society of Business Publication Editors), West Coast Bronze, Best Feature Story, for "Spam! How It Happens and How to Beat It" (edited)

Books 
 Simple Kabbalah: A Simple Wisdom Book, 2000, Conari Press,  (hardback),  (paperback)
 Cabala: para Viver com Sabedoria no Mundo Moderno, 2005, Nova Era, 
 Lonely Planet Out to Eat: San Francisco, Lonely Planet Publications,  (2002 edition),  (2000 edition)
 Countdown to Zero Day: Stuxnet and the Launch of the World's First Digital Weapon, 2014, Crown,

References 

 Kim Zetter - Author Archive | Wired.com
 Biography page at Conari Press

External links 
 Steal This Download The story of hi-tech grifter Dave Thomas
 "Tools: Free Stuff online", CNN, Sci-Tech, March 10, 2001, transcript (Kim Zetter's story)
 "Activist group to sue E-voting firm", NPR, November 3, 2003 (Kim Zetter is one of those interviewed)
 Invisible Ballots, 2004 video documentary in which Kim Zetter appears
 "Credit Cards That Don't Swipe", NPR (Kim Zetter, guest), May 24, 2005

American women journalists
American food writers
Writers from California
American technology writers
Living people
Year of birth missing (living people)
21st-century American women